Antonio Pérez González (born 7 June 1990) is a professional roller hockey player who plays for Sporting CP.

References

1990 births
Living people
Spanish roller hockey players
Sporting CP roller hockey players